McCoy Stadium is a former baseball stadium in Pawtucket, Rhode Island. From 1970 through 2020, it served as home field of the Pawtucket Red Sox (PawSox), a Minor League Baseball affiliate of the Boston Red Sox. Completed in 1942, the stadium first hosted an affiliated minor league team in 1946, the Pawtucket Slaters, a Boston Braves farm team. In 1981, the stadium hosted the longest professional baseball game in history, as the PawSox defeated the Rochester Red Wings in 33 innings by a score of 3–2.

History

Early years
The project to build the stadium began in 1938 and was championed by then-Pawtucket Mayor Thomas P. McCoy. It was to be built on a swampy piece of land known as Hammond's Pond and, to this day, the stadium sits at the end of Pond Street. On the afternoon of November 3, 1940, Mayor McCoy laid the foundation cornerstone.

Initially known as Pawtucket Stadium, it was completed in 1942, and in 1946 was officially named in honor of Mayor McCoy, who had died in August 1945. McCoy Stadium first began hosting affiliated Minor League Baseball in 1946. The Pawtucket Slaters, a Class B affiliate of the Boston Braves, was the first team to call McCoy Stadium home. The Pawtucket Slaters would play for four seasons in the New England League, as Braves affiliates.

Professional baseball disappeared from Pawtucket for 16 years. It finally returned in 1966, as McCoy became home of the Pawtucket Indians, who competed at the Double-A level in the Eastern League as an affiliate of the Cleveland Indians. After two seasons, the Indians moved to Waterbury, Connecticut, and McCoy was again without a team.

Red Sox arrival
In 1969, the Boston Red Sox had their Eastern League affiliate, the Pittsfield Red Sox of Pittsfield, Massachusetts, play at McCoy Stadium twice—one game in July and a doubleheader in August; the two events drew a total of over 10,000 fans. After the season, it was reported that the Pittsfield Red Sox would be relocated to McCoy Stadium. The team moved prior to the 1970 season, becoming the Pawtucket Red Sox, known colloquially as the "PawSox". The franchise spent three seasons playing in the Double-A Eastern League before being promoted to the Triple-A International League.

In 1976, debt-ridden owner Phil Anez threatened to move the team to New Jersey, but sold the franchise to Marvin Adelson, who lost the ballclub after threatening to move to Massachusetts.  During that year, the team was briefly known as the Rhode Island Red Sox, but that name lasted just one season.  Just before the 1977 season, Canadian expatriate businessman Ben Mondor arrived and successfully resurrected the fallen franchise. Mondor owned the team until his death on October 3, 2010, and was a well-beloved member of the community, as he turned the ballpark and franchise into one of the most fan-friendly in all of professional baseball.

The PawSox brought four championship titles to McCoy Stadium and Pawtucket, winning the Governors' Cup (the International League championship since 1933) in 1973, 1984, 2012, and 2014.

Red Sox departure

In February 2015, a group of New England business leaders, led by Larry Lucchino, purchased the Pawtucket Red Sox. In August 2018, ownership announced that it would relocate the team to a new stadium in Worcester, Massachusetts, in April 2021, becoming the Worcester Red Sox.

While 2020 was planned to be the PawSox' final season of play at McCoy Stadium, the Minor League Baseball season was cancelled, due to the COVID-19 pandemic in the United States. Thus, the final game contested by the PawSox at McCoy Stadium was the team's last game of the 2019 International League season, a 5–4 home victory over the Lehigh Valley IronPigs in 10 innings, played on September 2, 2019.

During the 2020 Major League Baseball season, McCoy Stadium served as the alternate training site for the Boston Red Sox.

Future plans
Without the PawSox as a tenant, the future of McCoy Stadium is unclear. In December 2019, Pawtucket's mayor, Donald Grebien, indicated options include bringing another minor league team to Pawtucket or "tearing the ballpark down for a new use." In May 2021, Grebien noted future opportunity with independent baseball leagues, or governmental use such as a public safety complex or high school. In December 2021, Grebien endorsed the explorations of a city panel which proposed total demolition of the city-owned site for the construction of a high school complex that would consolidate and replace the district's two existing schools. Initial renderings by SLAM architecture group show a 4-story academic complex with athletic facilities and an emphasis on CTE space. No official exploration or bids for designs have happened yet.

Stadium features

One of the unique features of the ballpark is the expansive foul territory. The foul area forms a complete semicircle between first and third, and in order to fit the baselines in between the ends of the seating areas, the area behind home plate is quite vast.  This is especially notable since the major league Red Sox' home park, Fenway Park, has the smallest foul territory in the majors.

The two dugouts are actually embedded into the wall underneath the grandstands (as are the luxury boxes, just beyond them). The first row of seats is elevated eight feet above field level. Despite that unusual box seat elevation, those seeking autographs of the players have found a way to contact their PawSox, using a technique more common to fans in bleacher seats behind an outfield wall. Fans wishing to have a scorebook, baseball, baseball card, or other souvenir signed by a player will go autograph "fishing". Complete with hook and reel (or, often, a hollowed-out milk jug and a rope), autograph seekers lower their items over the front of the seats and dangle them down in front of the dugouts below. The ballplayers can sign the item, tug on the line, and the fan pulls up their newly autographed memorabilia.

A series of murals depicting notable former PawSox players was displayed in the stadium prior to the 1998 renovation, but was taken down since the new stadium configuration resulted in fans not passing them anymore.  In 2004, after many fans asked what happened to them, funds were made available to restore and re-hang the old murals, as well as commission a few new ones of more recent players.  Some six dozen paintings now adorn the entrance ramps throughout the stadium.

The left-field berm provides great views of the action, and affords families on a budget an inexpensive way to enjoy the ballpark. Above the berms are walkways, affording patrons 360° views of the ballpark. They are made especially for the handicapped from which to utilize and enjoy the game.

Renovations

For many years, McCoy Stadium was not up to International League standards. The park had only 6,000 seats and was barely handicapped accessible. There were also a number of broken seats, and the facility was starting to show structural issues in the mid-1990s. For several years, the team's ownership was unsure of what to do, and it was even announced that the PawSox might be moved to Worcester, Massachusetts.

Eventually, owner Ben Mondor announced that they would renovate the facility, and that renovations would be done to maintain the historical integrity of the ballpark. The renovations began in 1998 and included a new terraced berm in left field, a grassy knoll where fans can sit next to the PawSox bullpen and watch the game up close.

The seating capacity was increased to 10,031 by adding three full sections of seats. In addition to the original quarter-circle seating bowl, McCoy now features an extended left-field line seating area and souvenir stand, as well as outfield bleacher seating and new parking areas. Luxury boxes were constructed below the new seating area at field level.  All seats are now accessed through an entry tower near third base, instead of the circular ramps which still remain behind home plate.  The seats are elevated above the field, and patrons must climb two sets of stairs (or take an elevator) to reach the main concourse and outfield berm areas.

With the renovations to the stadium, the Pawtucket Red Sox raised their average game day attendance to a league-leading 9,561 in 2005.

Notable games and incidents
 On April 18, 1981, the Pawtucket Red Sox began the longest game in professional baseball history. For 20 innings, the PawSox battled the Rochester Red Wings in a 1–1 tie. The Red Wings would finally score in the top of the 21st inning to take the lead. The PawSox then scored a run in the bottom of the inning. The game was far from over. The game went on until 4:07 a.m. because the umpires did not have a curfew rule in their copy of the rule book.  Finally the league president was reached and demanded that the game be suspended. The score was tied, 2–2 after the 32nd inning. When the game finally did resume on June 23, it took only 18 minutes to complete, as Dave Koza of the PawSox drove in the winning run in the bottom of the 33rd inning. Two future Hall of Famers were part of the historic game. Cal Ripken Jr. went 2–13 on the night playing third base for Rochester. Wade Boggs played third base for Pawtucket and went 4–12 with a double and an RBI.  19 fans remained in the stands when the game was called for the night, and they received lifetime passes to McCoy Stadium.
 On April 9, 1992, during the PawSox' home opener against Rochester, WJAR sports reporter Joe Rocco started a live report on the side of the field, while the game was in progress, for that day's 6 p.m. edition of "News Watch 10". Because the bright newscamera lights bothered some of the players, the home plate umpire went over and told Rocco that they were not going to hold up the game for a live news report. Rocco asked for 30 seconds to finish his report, but the umpire refused and called security to eject Rocco, forcing Rocco to end his live report.
 On July 3, 2001, PawSox player Israel "Izzy" Alcantara was hit by a pitch by Scranton/Wilkes-Barre Red Barons pitcher Blas Cedeño.  Feeling that he had been thrown at, Alcantara responded by kicking catcher Jeremy Salazar in the chest and then charging the mound.  The pitcher backed away, and after momentarily trying to get anyone on the Red Barons to fight, Alcantara was engulfed in the ensuing bench-clearing brawl. Alcantara was suspended for six games.
 On July 14, 2004, McCoy Stadium hosted the Triple-A All-Star Game between the International League and the Pacific Coast League. The IL won the game, 4–3 in 10 innings, before a crowd of 11,192.
 On April 26, 2006, during that season's minor league umpire strike, Durham Bulls player and Tampa Bay Devil Rays prospect Delmon Young threw a bat at a replacement umpire who had ejected him from the game.  Young struck out on a called third strike, and stood at the plate (silently, according to PawSox catcher Corky Miller) before walking away.  When the umpire signaled that he was ejected, Young responded by throwing his bat, end-over-end, at the umpire, who was hit in his chest protector with the bat.  The International League suspended Young for 50 games for the incident.
 McCoy has seen two perfect games thrown by PawSox pitchers.  On June 1, 2000, Tomokazu Ohka defeated the Charlotte Knights 2–0, needing just 76 pitches to retire all 27 Charlotte batters. On August 10, 2003, Bronson Arroyo blanked the Buffalo Bisons by a score of 7–0. Arroyo was called up to the Boston Red Sox later that month.

Attendance
When Ben Mondor bought control of the team in 1977, the PawSox drew only 70,354 fans (1,082 per game) to McCoy, which seated 5,800 people at the time. A few seats were added along the way, and during the mid-1990s, the park's capacity was listed as 7,002.

In 1999, the first season after the McCoy expansion, the PawSox averaged a paid attendance of 8,403 per game, and in 2000 it increased to 8,733.  That figure represented 87% of every seat for every game being sold, where no other team in the league was above 70%.  The club's top two attendance figures have come in 2004 and 2005, and with a paid attendance of 688,421, the '05 PawSox ranked fourth among all minor-league teams in any sport in North America.  In New England, they ranked as the biggest draw of any sporting event except their parent club, the Red Sox at Fenway Park.

Going into the 2006 season, the top 88 single-game attendance figures have come in the past seven years since the expansion.  The current record crowd of 11,802 was set on September 5, 2004, for a late-season game against Scranton with the PawSox in playoff contention.  (The season finale the next day, at 11,067, ranks 13th.)  Prior to the expansion, the notable single-game record occurred on July 1, 1982, when 9,389 showed up for the pitching match-up of Mark Fidrych versus Dave Righetti.

Other events

Political rally
On October 30, 1944, then Senator and Vice-Presidential candidate Harry S. Truman addressed a Democratic rally at the stadium, in support of re-electing President Franklin D. Roosevelt.

High school football

Once a year, on the night before Thanksgiving, football is played inside McCoy Stadium.  Tolman High School and Saint Raphael Academy play their regular season games at the adjacent Pariseau Field (also known as the McCoy Annex).  But, for 73 years, the two schools played each other on Thanksgiving, with most of those games played inside McCoy Stadium.  That holiday rivalry ended in 2001 but the games still continue.  The schools alternate the use of the stadium.  Tolman hosts their new rival, the crosstown Shea High School, on the odd-number years. Saint Raphael will host Moses Brown School on the even-number years. In the mid-1990s the original Saints-Tolman game moved from Thanksgiving morning to the night before.

Concerts
For three years, McCoy Stadium hosted an annual concert during the summer. Bob Dylan was the first to perform at the stadium in 2006. Collective Soul, Live and Counting Crows performed in 2007.  In 2008, Boston-based bands The Mighty Mighty Bosstones and Dropkick Murphys performed at McCoy as part of a three-stadium tour. The tour also included LeLacheur Park in Lowell, Massachusetts and Hadlock Field in Portland, Maine. These stadiums are also home Boston Red Sox minor league teams, respectively the Lowell Spinners and Portland Sea Dogs.

Dining on the Diamond
After the cancellation of the 2020 minor league baseball season due to the COVID-19 pandemic, the PawSox developed a "Dining on the Diamond" program which served dinner to nearly 6,000 people on the baseball field from June through August, with a waiting list of more than 3,600 entering September.

References

External links

Pawtucket Red Sox: McCoy Stadium
Ball Parks of the Minor Leagues: McCoy Stadium 
Digital Ballparks: McCoy Stadium
Minor League Ballparks: McCoy Stadium
Baseball Pilgrimages: McCoy Stadium
Project Ballpark: McCoy Stadium

Pawtucket Red Sox
Sports venues in Rhode Island
Sports venues in Providence County, Rhode Island
Works Progress Administration in Rhode Island
Baseball venues in Rhode Island
American football venues in Rhode Island